State Route 263 (SR 263) is a  route that serves as a connection between SR 185 northwest of Greenville  in Fort Dale with SR 21 at Braggs.

Route description
The northern terminus of SR 263 is located at its intersection with SR 21 in Braggs. The route then takes a southeasterly track to its southern terminus at SR 185 in Fort Dale to the northwest of Greenville.

Major intersections

References

263
Transportation in Butler County, Alabama
Transportation in Lowndes County, Alabama